Watari Dam is a dam located  in Bagwai Local Government area in the north west of Kano State of Nigeria. It was constructed between 1977 and 1980 at a cost of Nigerian Naira ₦7,108,000.00.

The community uses the water for agricultural purposes in the area. There is a water pump that sends water from the dam to other parts of Kano City and other towns in the state such as Bichi and Bagwai.

It is the third largest dam in Kano State with a total storage capacity of 104.55Mm2. The purpose for the building of the dam is for flood control and irrigation, fisheries and the secondary benefit include recreation water supply and wild conservation.

References 

Dams in Nigeria
Kano State
Yobe State
Dams completed in 1974
20th-century architecture in Nigeria